Presidential elections were held in the Seychelles in June 1989. Following a coup in 1977, the Seychelles People's Progressive Front was the sole legal party, and its leader, France-Albert René, was the only candidate in the election. He was re-elected with 96.1% of the votes on a 91.5% turnout.

Results

References

Single-candidate elections
1989 in Seychelles
Presidential elections in Seychelles
One-party elections
Seychelles